is Do As Infinity's 22nd single, released on January 20, 2010. Of the four songs on the single, only the title track is new - the remaining three are the previously released songs "Fukai Mori", "Shinjitsu no Uta" and "Rakuen". The four songs on the single were all used as theme songs to either the Inuyasha anime series or the animated film Inuyasha the Movie: Fire on the Mystic Island; the single was released as a commemoration of this. Four versions of the single were produced: a CD+DVD set in regular and first-print editions, and a CD-only release also in regular and first-print editions. A music video directed by Wataru Takeishi was produced for "Kimi ga Inai Mirai".

The lyrics of "Kimi ga Inai Mirai" include the song titles of the other three songs on the single.

Track listing

DVD
 (music clip)
 (music clip)
 (music clip)
 (music clip)
 (anime opening video)
 (anime ending video)
 (anime ending video)

Chart positions

References

External links
"Kimi ga Inai Mirai" at Avex Network
"Kimi ga Inai Mirai" at Oricon

2010 singles
Do As Infinity songs
Inuyasha songs
Songs written by Tomiko Van
Song recordings produced by Seiji Kameda
2010 songs
Avex Trax singles